Espiritu Santo is the largest island in the nation of Vanuatu.

Espíritu Santo (Spanish, 'holy spirit') may also refer to:

Places
 Isla Espíritu Santo, a Mexican island in the Gulf of California
 Espiritu Santo Island (Panama), Pearl Islands, Panama
 Espíritu Santo (fort), a former Spanish fortress in the Bio-Bio Region of Chile
 Espiritu Santo Airport, Espiritu Santo, Usulután Department, El Salvador
 Espiritu Santo Bay, Texas, U.S.
 Espíritu Santo Cape, on the border between Chile and Argentina
 Espíritu Santo River, Bolivia
 Espíritu Santo (volcano), on the border between Chile and Argentina
 Espíritu Santo, Riópar, a church in Riópar, Castilla-La Mancha, Spain
 Coatzacoalcos, formerly Espíritu Santo, Mexico
 Naval Advance Base Espiritu Santo, a World War II American naval in the New Hebrides, now Vanuatu

Other uses
 C.D. Espíritu Santo, a Salvadoran professional football club
 Espíritu Santo antelope squirrel, a rodent endemic to Mexico
 , Guayaquil, Ecuador
 , common name, in Spanish, of the orchid Peristeria elata

See also

 Espírito Santo (disambiguation)
 Holy Spirit (disambiguation)
 Sancti Spiritus (disambiguation)
 Santo Spirito (disambiguation)